Slevin's mouse (Peromyscus slevini), also known as the Catalina deer mouse, is a species of rodent in the family Cricetidae. It is named for Joseph Slevin, a curator at the California Academy of Sciences.

They have pale cinnamon fur, mixed with dusky hairs, over the body, head, and flanks, with near-white underparts. They appear very similar to the related California mouse, but are paler in color and slightly larger. However, it may be most closely related to the North American deer mouse.

The species is threatened by competition with the introduced Northern Baja deer mouse, which was probably introduced by local fishermen.

References

Peromyscus
Mammals described in 1924
Fauna of Gulf of California islands
Endemic mammals of Mexico
Endemic fauna of the Baja California Peninsula
Endangered animals
Taxonomy articles created by Polbot